Lloyd Tilghman Binford (December 16, 1866 – August 27, 1956) was an American insurance executive and film censor who was the head of the Memphis Censor Board for 28 years.

The son of an infantry colonel, Binford left high school at 16  for a job as a railway postal clerk. After moving to Memphis, he eventually became president of the Columbian Mutual Life Insurance Company and a Freemason noted for his views on "Southern womanhood" and white supremacy. He once told Collier's that at his funeral "two rows of seats in the rear" would be "set aside for my Negro friends".

Binford's changes included the removal of whipping and crucifixion sequences from Cecil B. de Mille's The King of Kings and cuts to or bans of numerous films with African-American stars or topics, including Imitation of Life, Sensations of 1945, and Brewster's Millions (1945). In 1945, he attracted national attention when he banned the Jean Renoir film The Southerner, citing his opinion that the Southern characters were portrayed as "common, lowdown, ignorant white trash". The film's producer David Loew retorted that "Binford must have been sniffing too many magnolias." Boxoffice magazine noted in an editorial that Binford's opinion of The Southerner contrasted with that of the United Daughters of the Confederacy, which endorsed the film as portraying "'the courage, stout-heartedness and love of our land which is an outstanding characteristic of the south.'"  Binford also objected to any film that featured a train robbery, and blocked release in Memphis of Jesse James, The Return of Frank James, The Outlaw, and others.

Among the other films Binford had banned from Memphis was the comedy Curley (1947), which was executive-produced by Hal Roach in the style of his earlier Our Gang shorts. Binford stated in a letter to the distributor, "'[The board] was unable to approve your 'Curley' picture with the little Negroes as the south does not permit Negroes in white schools nor recognize social equality between the races, even in children.'"

Binford also occasionally banned films because of the personal conduct of the stars rather than the content of the movies. In 1950, referring to Ingrid Bergman's affair with director Roberto Rossellini, he announced that Bergman's films were banned from Memphis "'because of her conduct, not because of the pictures'.... 'We haven't even seen "Stromboli" and we don't expect to see it,'" Binford said. The following year, a re-release of Charlie Chaplin's 1931 film City Lights was banned from Memphis. Binford's explanation of the ban stated that although "'[t]here's nothing wrong with the picture itself'", the film could not be shown in the city "'because of Chaplin's character and reputation'"; Binford was referring to Chaplin's 4th marriage to the 18-year old Oona O'Neil in 1943.

Binford became increasingly ill during the 1950s, and retired from his post as chairman of the Censor Board on January 1, 1956. He died of conditions stemming from an attack of influenza on August 27, 1956. The Censor Board itself continued operations until July 1965, when U.S. Circuit Judge Bailey Brown declared it to be unconstitutional.

References 

1866 births
1956 deaths
Censors
People from Memphis, Tennessee
People from Duck Hill, Mississippi